Dross Glop is a remix compilation album by American experimental rock band Battles. It was released on April 16, 2012, and compiles remixes by various artists of Battles' songs from Gloss Drop (2011), eleven of which were originally released over a series of four 12-inch singles. The compilation includes a remix of "Sundome" that was not included on any of the vinyl releases.

The four 12" singles were numbered from 1 to 4, and were announced on Battles' website and Facebook page, and released from February (the first on February 6/7 internationally and in the US, respectively) to April 2012. The final part, Dross Glop 4, was released on Record Store Day 2012 (April 21), following the release of this compilation.

The album title is a spoonerism of the title of the band's album Gloss Drop, which the original versions of the songs are from. All four of the vinyl sleeves and the compilation's cover are also based on the initial art for Gloss Drop, intermixing different colored paints on the pink of the original sculpture.

Reception
Dross Glop received a score of 63/100 on Metacritic, indicating "generally favorable reviews". musicOMH summarised that the album was "unchallenging territory" for the band, giving it three out of five stars.

Slant Magazines Kevin Liedel, in a two-out-of-five stars review, opined that "while the album's contributors lean in a well-intentioned direction, preferring organic, innovative methods over simply pasting some vocal lines and guitar riffs on top of standard, synth-driven BPMs, Dross Glop is, at best, uneven," also calling it "scattershot, meandering, awkward, and often boring".

PopMatters John Garratt said, "The best remix albums can capture the listener's imagination and take it down bold new paths. But in this case, if you want bold imagination, you really should side with the original Gloss Drop."

More positive reviews came from such publications as Pitchfork, who awarded the album 7.8 out of 10, and acclaimed Hudson Mohawke's remix of "Rolls Bayce", calling it "an unexpectedly soft and emotive take from the Glasgow producer"; Kode9's remix of "Africastle", saying it is a "seven-minute, house-focused mini set of sorts, fizzing and grinding ominously before slamming into a kind of chiptune dancehall dance party"; and Qluster's "Dominican Fade", which "pairs prim horns with beautiful organ glimmers, sounding nothing like the source material but no worse for it."

AllMusic's Heather Phares gave the album 3.5 out of 5 stars, and said "Gang Gang Dance gives Gloss Drop single 'Ice Cream' one of the most playful and successful treatments, adding to it a futuristic Latin twist with dive-bombing bass, a low-rider beat, and chanting vocals," also noting that "Like many remix collections, Dross Glop doesn't flow particularly well, and it's not quite as dazzling as Gloss Drop, but it once again shows that Battles are up for anything."

Track listing

* These tracks were edited for the CD release, but are included on the vinyl formats in their original full-length forms.

Dross Glop 1
Released February 6, 2012 internationally and February 7 in the US.

Dross Glop 2
Released February 20, 2012 internationally and February 21 in the US.

Dross Glop 3
Released on March 19, 2012 internationally and March 20 in the US.

Dross Glop 4
Released April 21, 2012 (Record Store Day) in the US and internationally.

References

2012 remix albums
Warp (record label) albums
Battles (band) compilation albums
Albums produced by Hudson Mohawke